Kali Jo White VanBaale (born January 20, 1975) is an American novelist who publishes under both her maiden and married name. Her debut novel, The Space Between (as Kali VanBaale), received an American Book Award in 2007, an Independent Publisher's silver medal for general fiction, and the Fred Bonnie Memorial First Novel Award in 2006. Her second novel, The Good Divide (as Kali VanBaale) was released in 2016. Her third novel, 'The Monsters We Make' (as Kali White) released in 2020 from Crooked Lane Books.

Life
VanBaale grew up in Bloomfield, Iowa on a dairy farm. She attended Indian Hills Community College, Upper Iowa University, and Vermont College of Fine Arts where she received her MFA in creative writing.

She has taught creative writing and literature for Drake University and Upper Iowa University. She is a core faculty member of the Lindenwood University MFA in Writing Program.

She lives outside Des Moines with her family.

Awards
2022 Lindenwood University Adjunct Professor of the Year 
2022 Indian Hills Community College Outstanding Alumnus 
2017 Eric Hoffer Book Award, The Good Divide
2009 and 2021 Iowa Arts Council major artist grants
2007 American Book Award, The Space Between
2007 Independent Publisher's Silver Medal for General Fiction, The Space Between
2006 Fred Bonnie Memorial First Novelist Award, The Space Between

Works
The Monsters We Make. Crooked Lane Books. June 2020 
The Good Divide. MGPress. June 2016.

Anthologies

Nonfiction
A&E Network True Crime blog series

References

External links

1975 births
21st-century American novelists
American women novelists
Living people
People from Bloomfield, Iowa
Vermont College of Fine Arts alumni
Upper Iowa University alumni
21st-century American women writers
American Book Award winners